Loveppears (stylized as LOVEppears) is the second studio album by Japanese recording artist Ayumi Hamasaki. It was released in Japan, Hong Kong and China on November 10, 1999 through Avex Trax and the China Record Corporation, and distributed worldwide on April 10, 2001 by Avex Entertainment Inc. It was entirely written by Hamasaki herself, while the production was handled by Japanese musician Max Matsuura. Musically, Loveppears is a dance album and lyrically focuses on themes of love, frustration of life, loneliness, and individualism.

Upon its release, Loveppears received favorable reviews from music critics. Many of those highlighted the singles as some of her best work, and complimented the transition from Hamasaki's previous pop rock-inspired music to dance. Commercially, the album was a success in Japan, reaching the top of the Oricon Albums Chart and eventually sold over 2.6 million units there, making it the 40th best selling album in that region. It was certified twice Million by the Recording Industry Association of Japan (RIAJ) for physical shipments of two million units, and is Hamasaki's third highest selling album based on Oricon Style's database, The album was nominated the Asia Association Music Prize Awards.

To promote the album, Hamasaki released 11 singles. One of the singles, "Love (Destiny)", became her first single to top the Oricon Singles Chart, other singles were able to reach the top ten). "Boys & Girls" and the extended play A sold over one million units, a first for Hamasaki. The majority of the album's material were promoted through Japanese commercials, which later became a staple for Hamasaki's future work, and some songs appeared on various remix albums conducted by Hamasaki. She performed most of the songs on her 2000 Japan concert tour.

Background and composition
After the success of Hamasaki's January 1999 studio album A Song for ××, she began writing songs for her next studio album. However, her record label Avex Trax decided to release a remix album titled Ayu-mi-x. The record marked the beginning of the incorporation of music elements outside of her pop rock sound, including trance, house and electronic music. This transition into mainstream dance music made Hamasaki recruit new composers and producers for the then-upcoming studio album, including Japanese dance band HΛL, Do As Infinity member and composer Dai Nagao, and Kazuhito Kikuchi, amongst others.

Avex Trax hired Japanese musician Max Matsuura to produce the entire record, along with Hamasaki and Japanese musician Naoto Suzuki's help, while Hamasaki wrote every song on the album. Recording sessions were handled at Prime Sound Studio, Studio Sound Dali, and Onkio Haus in Tokyo, Japan, and at Soundtrack Studios in New York City, United States; the final material was then mixed at Studio Sound Dali and Conway Studios in Los Angeles, California, and mastered by Eddy Schreyer at Oasis Masterings.

Loveppears was noted by critics as Hamasaki's first transition from her "cautious" pop rock style in A Song for ××. The album includes two instrumental tracks: "Introduction", which was composed by HΛL, and the "Interlude" song that was composed by Naoto Suzuki. Some of the singles on Loveppears had been remixed and re-composed, including "Fly High"; extended versions of "Whatever", "Too Late", "Appears"; and a revised version of "Love (Destiny)", which was re-written and titled "Love: Refrain". The album also includes a hidden track on the song "Who...", which is the album version of "Kanariya". Lyrically, the material on the album focuses on themes of love, frustration of life, loneliness, and individualism.

Release and packaging
Loveppears was released in Japan, Hong Kong and China on November 10, 1999 through Avex Trax and the China Record Corporation. The album included the seventeen tracks and, apart from the Chinese release, included a bonus Enhanced CD that features commercial files, small audio samples of all her recordings, internet links, images of magazine appearances, files of Hamasaki's voice, and images of Hamasaki being photographed in New York City, New York. The enhanced CD also includes five remixes; two non-stop mega mixes of Eurodance and house inspired music, the Millennium mix of "A Song for ××", an acoustic mix of "Powder Snow", and the Make Me Mad remix of "Friend II". On April 10, 2001, the album was re-released worldwide by Avex Entertainment Inc. through digital outlets.

The artwork for Loveppears was shot by Toru Kumazawa in New York City and Los Angeles, California. The cover features Hamasaki topless with a light brown wig covering her breasts. Hamasaki believed that the material on the album influenced her decision in calling the album Loveappears, stating "While working on A Song for ××, during the sad times that I couldn't shake, I'd always be saying 'I'm very sad, I can't shake this.' Quietly crying, quietly wounded, quietly mourning. But with Loveppears, I express it with furious sounds, shouting out, screaming." During an interview with Japanese magazine Beatfreak in November 1999, Hamasaki explained that the title represented the visual aspects of a relationship (appears) and how people see love; she explained in full detail;

Singles

11 singles were released to promote Loveppears, including one extended play and three limited edition releases. The first single was "Whatever", which was released on February 10, 1999 on physical and digital formats. In Japan, it became her highest charting single on the Oricon Singles Chart at the time, reaching number five. The following single, "Love (Destiny)", was released on April 14, 1999 on physical and digital formats. It became Hamasaki's first single to reach the top of the Oricon Single Chart. "To Be" was released as the album's third single on May 12, 1999, and reached the top five on the Oricon Singles Chart. The next two singles; "Boys & Girls" and the extended play A (included the songs "Trauma", "End Roll", "Monochrome", "Too Late"), managed to sell over one million units each, with the latter release becoming Hamasaki best selling single according to the data base at Oricon Style. Each individual track from A were promoted through commercial endorsements in Japan.

The next three singles; "Appears", "Kanariya", and "Fly High", had a limited availability of 300,000 copies. "Appears" was released on November 10, 1999 in physical and digital formats. The single was also Hamasaki's first release outside of Japan, having been remixed by Junior Vasquez and Armin Van Buuren, and distributed in 2001–2002 throughout North America and Europe. "Kanariya" was released on December 8, 1999, and was her only limited edition single from the album to peak at number one on the Oricon Singles Chart. It was her second single to have been released in North America, having been remixed by Jonathan Peters. The album's final single was "Fly High", which was released in Japan on February 9, 2000, her first single inside of the 2000s decade.

Avex Trax USA and Europe decided to release promotional 12 inch vinyls of various tracks from Loveppears. "Monochrome" was remixed by Keith Litman and released in North America, while The Orb remixed the track and released it in the United Kingdom. American duo Thunderpuss remixed the track "Trauma" and released it in North America through Avex Trax USA. "Too Late" was remixed by Soul Solution and was released in North America, while the original mix of the album track "Immature" was released as a double A-side single with "Appears" in Japan, as part of a promotion for her 2000 concert tour.

Reception
Upon its release, Loveppears received positive reviews from most music critics. A staff member working for CD Journal enjoyed the album and labeled it "bold". The review also stated that the music on Loveppears was at "high quality", and praised the producers and composers work on the material. The album brought Hamasaki several nominations and accolades, including a win at the Japan Gold Disc Awards for Best Pop Album of the Year, marking her second win after A Song for xx. Alongside this, her single A won the award for Song of the Year.

Commercially, Loveppears was a success in Japan. The album debuted at number one on the Oricon Albums Chart, selling over 1.2 million units in its first week of sales. The record became the 34th album with the highest first week sales, and is Hamasaki's third feat. By the end of 1999, the album was ranked at number 14 on the Oricon Yearly Albums Chart with over 1,443,490 units sold; this made it the fourth highest selling album by a female artist, just behind Mariah Carey, Ami Suzuki and Hikaru Utada. The album continued to chart in 2000, and effectively sold an additional 1,077,960 units by the end of that year, reaching number 14 on the annual chart. The album stayed in the Oricon Top 200 chart for 64 weeks, becoming Hamasaki's longest spanning entry to date.

It was certified double Million by the Recording Industry Association of Japan (RIAJ) for physical shipments of two million units, and is Hamasaki's third highest selling album based on Oricon Style's database. As of July 2016, Loveppears has sold over 2.5 million units in Japan, and is the 40th best selling album in Japan of all time; this marks it Hamasaki's second highest studio album behind Duty, and the 10th highest selling album by a female artist.

Promotion

Hamasaki promoted the album with extensive commercial deals in Japan; according to Alexey Eremenko from AllMusic, he commented in his biography of Hamasaki, "its success boosted by ad contracts that Hamasaki has raked in ever since as a spokesman, beginning with the Asian cosmetics juggernaut Kose (later she also worked for the likes of Honda and Panasonic)." She went onto promote several other products within Asia, including various food snacks, vehicles, and technology. In retrospect of the commercial deals, although Hamasaki initially supported the exploitation of her popularity for commercial purposes, saying that it was "necessary that [she is] viewed as a product", she eventually opposed Avex's decision to market her as a "product rather than a person".

Several tracks from Loveppears were featured on remix compilations during 1999 and 2000. The first was her February 2000 Eurobeat compilation Super Eurobeat Presents Ayu-ro Mix. A four album series were then released to support Loveppears; the first three were the Japanese remix album Ayu-mi-x II Version JPN, the American and European remix album ayu-mi-x II Version US+EU and the acoustic Ayu-mi-x II Version Acoustic Orchestra, all released on March 8, 2000. The final album, Ayu-mi-x II Version Non-Stop Mega Mix, reached number six and was certified platinum by RIAJ.

Hamasaki then performed several tracks from Loveppears on concert tours, including Ayumi Hamasaki Concert Tour 2000 Vol. 1, Ayumi Hamasaki Concert Tour 2000 Vol. 2, Ayumi Hamasaki Stadium Tour 2002 A and Ayumi Hamasaki Arena Tour 2003–2004 A. The music videos to "Whatever", "Love (Destiny)", "To Be", "Boys & Girls", "Appears", "Kanariya", "Fly High" and other album promotional footage were featured on her 2004 video box set Ayumi Hamasaki Complete Clip Box A.

Track listing

Additional notes
Dai Nagao is credited as the alias D.A.I. in the liner notes.

Credits and personnel
Credits adapted from the CD liner notes of Loveppears.

Tatsuyan Ikeda – marketing
Kentaro Furusawa – marketing
Yasuhiro Yamamoto – marketing
Akiiro Terada – marketing
Ayumi Hamasaki – vocals, background vocals, songwriting
Toru Kumazawa – photography
Koji Matsumoto – glam team
Tadamasa Tagami – glam team
Gina – assistant photography
Chika – glam team
Taro – glam team
Kananko Miura – glam team
Shinichi Hara – art direction

Michiho Ogasawara – design
Toshikazu Sakawa – creative co-ordination 
Jun Kujiwara – guitar
Masayoshi Furukawa – guitar
Naoki Harashibe – guitar
Naoya Akimoto – guitar
Hidetoshi Suzukie – guitar
Naoto Suzuki – keyboards, synthesizers, mixing, arrangement, composer, additional production
Hal – mixing, arrangement, composer, keyboards, synthesizers
Max Matsuura - producer, additional production
Eddy Schreyer - mastering

Charts

Weekly charts

Year-end charts

Certification and sales

Release history

See also

List of awards received by Ayumi Hamasaki
Ayumi Hamasaki discography
List of Oricon number-one albums of 1999

Notes

References

External links
Loveppears at Ayumi Hamasaki's official website. 

1999 albums
Ayumi Hamasaki albums
Avex Group albums
Japanese-language albums